Ganjabad or Gonjabad may refer to:

East Azerbaijan Province
 Ganjabad-e Olya, East Azerbaijan, a village in Hashtrud County
 Ganjabad-e Sofla, East Azerbaijan, a village in Hashtrud County

Isfahan Province
 Ganjabad, Isfahan, a village in Isfahan County

Kerman Province
 Ganjabad-e Olya, Kerman, a village in Anbarabad County
 Ganjabad-e Sofla, Kerman, a village in Anbarabad County
 Ganjabad, Manujan, a village in Manujan County
 Ganjabad 1, a village in Qaleh Ganj County
 Ganjabad 2, a village in Qaleh Ganj County
 Ganjabad Rural District, in Anbarabad County

Khuzestan Province
 Ganjabad, Khuzestan

Sistan and Baluchestan Province
 Ganjabad, Iranshahr, a village in Iranshahr County

South Khorasan Province
 Ganjabad, Birjand, a village in Birjand County

West Azerbaijan Province
 Ganjabad, Miandoab, a village in Miandoab County
 Ganjabad, Oshnavieh, a village in Oshnavieh County
 Ganjabad, Urmia, a village in Urmia County

Zanjan Province
 Ganjabad, Zanjan